The Buchholz Family is a 1944 German drama film directed by Carl Froelich and starring Henny Porten, Paul Westermeier, and Käthe Dyckhoff. It is a family chronicle set in late nineteenth century Berlin. It is based on an 1884 novel by Julius Stinde. It was followed by a second part Marriage of Affection, released the same year. It was shot at the Tempelhof Studios in Berlin. The film's sets were designed by the art director Walter Haag.

Cast

References

Bibliography
 Noack, Frank. Veit Harlan: The Life and Work of a Nazi Filmmaker. University Press of Kentucky, 2016.

External links

Films of Nazi Germany
German historical drama films
German black-and-white films
1940s historical drama films
Films directed by Carl Froelich
Films set in Berlin
Films set in the 19th century
UFA GmbH films
Films shot at Tempelhof Studios
1940s German-language films
1940s German films